Frederick or Fred Humphreys may refer to:

 Frederick K. Humphreys (1816–1900), American physician; founder of Humphreys Homeopathic Medicine Company
 Frederick Humphreys (athlete) (1878–1954), British tug of war competitor and sport wrestler
 Frederick E. Humphreys (1883–1941), one of the original three military pilots trained by the Wright brothers
 Fred Humphreys (1907–1967), Australian government official, amateur photographer and botanist

See also
 Frederick Humphries (disambiguation)